Aura: Fate of the Ages is an adventure-genre computer game created by Canadian studio Streko-Graphics Inc. and published by The Adventure Company. In 2007, Streko-Graphics Inc. released the second chapter, Aura II: The Sacred Rings, which continues the story of the first game. The final chapter of Aura trilogy, Aura III: Catharsis, was originally slated to be released in 2011, but this project was eventually cancelled.

Reception

The game received "mixed" reviews according to the review aggregation website Metacritic.

IGN said, "What little Aura does to advance the genre it does remarkably well. In an age when encountering logical puzzles is as rare as pooping out gold nuggets, Aura shines as a game that attempts to bring a little reason into the mix." However, GameSpy said, "The few good puzzles contained within aren't worth the time and risk that you might not even be able to complete it."

References

External links
 Official website
 

2004 video games
Aura (video game series)
Embracer Group franchises
Windows games
Windows-only games
Adventure games
Steampunk video games
The Adventure Company games
Video games developed in Canada